Tahir Mosque is an Ahmadi Muslim mosque in Koblenz, in the German state of Rhineland-Palatinate.

References

Ahmadiyya mosques in Germany
Religious buildings and structures in Rhineland-Palatinate
Buildings and structures in Koblenz
Mosques completed in 2004